Upper Cornish Creek is a former rural locality in the Barcaldine Region, Queensland, Australia.

On 22 November 2019 the Queensland Government decided to amalgamate the localities in the Barcaldine Region, resulting in five expanded localities based on the larger towns: Alpha, Aramac, Barcaldine, Jericho and Muttaburra. Upper Cornish Creek was incorporated into Aramac.

Geography 
The Aramac Torrens Creek Road passes through the locality from the south-west (Pelican Creek) to the north-west (Torrens Creek).

The western part of the locality is mountainous and on the western side of the Great Dividing Range.

The principal land use is grazing on native vegetation.

History 
The locality takes its name from the creek, which was named  in 1860 by explorer by William Landsborough after his business partner pastoralist Edward Cornish.

Education 
There are no schools in Upper Cornish Creek. The nearest primary schools are in Muttaburra and Aramac. The nearest secondary schools are in Aramac (to Year 10) and Barcaldine (to Year 12).

References 

Barcaldine Region
Unbounded localities in Queensland
Aramac